The Italian community of Melbourne is the second largest ethnic group in Greater Melbourne, Victoria (Australia), second to the Anglo-Celtic Australians ethnic group. The 2011 Census counted
that of the 185,402 residents that were born in Italy who live in Australia, 68,823 lived in Melbourne, which was the highest percentage of the country at 37.1%. The same could be said for the total Australian population of Italian ancestry, with 279,112 of the 916,121 (30.4%) listed as Melbourne residents, which is the highest Italian population in Australia and the Oceanic continent per city.

History

Victorian gold rush era
Inaugural records of the Italian community of Melbourne are debated as official records are obscured. It is known that the Victorian gold rush of the 1850s attracted approximately 4,000 ethnic Italians to the colony. These immigrants primarily came from the Valtellina region in Lombardy or the southern Swiss cantons. The drain on the labour supply occasioned by the gold rush caused Australia to also seek workmen from Europe for land use and the development of cultivation. Once the gold rush ended in the late 1860s, most Italians returned home. The exact number of Italians who came to Victoria during this period is unknown as until 1871 Italians did not receive a special place in any Australian census figures.

Late 19th century - World War I 
A group of musicians from the town of Viggiano in the Basilicata region formed a small community in Little Lonsdale Street in the 1890s and relocated to Carlton. Immigrants from the Aeolian Islands in Sicily began to settle in the inner-city suburbs, working in as fruiterers. By 1891, there were 1,700 Italians in Victoria (91% were male). In 1896, the Dante Alighieri Society branch in Melbourne was founded to promote Italian language and culture in the city.

Post World War II 
The northern inner-suburbs saw the highest population densities of Italian migration between the 1940s-60's. These suburbs consisted of Brunswick, Brunswick East, Brunswick West, Carlton, Carlton North, Fitzroy, Fitzroy North, Parkville and Princes Hill. Of all the listed suburbs, the highest concentration in Carlton, saw the eventual establishment of Melbourne's current Little Italy, on Lygon Street, between the intersections of Elgin & Queensberry streets.

Post global financial crisis migration
In the recent years, Australia has been witnessing a new wave of migration from Italy in numbers not seen in half a century, as thousands flee the economic hardship in Europe, with the Financial crisis of 2007–08 playing a large role, many Italians migrated from Italy to Australia in large numbers. The explosion of numbers saw more than 20,000 Italians arrive in Australia in 2012-13 on temporary visas, exceeding the number of Italians that arrived in 1950-51 during the previous migration boom following World War II.

Today
Today, the city of Melbourne is a sister city to Milan, Italy, with the city's population consisting of 68,823 residents by birth, and 279,112 residents by heritage, as of 2011. Recent restaurant expansion on Lygon street has seen many new Italian restaurants open in the Brunswick East side and also seen the re location of Mondo Music (50 Lygon Street Brunswick East) - the iconic retail store specialising in Italian DVD's, CD's and other Italian merchandise. The recently redeveloped Abruzzo club opened 377 on Lygon in late 2015, and the international award-winning 400 gradi restaurant, that was declared to have the 'world's best pizza' in 2014.

Lygon Street - Melbourne's Little Italy

The Italian restaurant district synonymous with Lygon Street district occupies a number of blocks between Queensberry Street in the South, along Lygon Street, to Elgin Street in the North. Restaurants can also be found along the streets intersecting Lygon Street, towards the Carlton Gardens in the East and the University of Melbourne in the West. The Lygon Street Festa is an annual celebration that is one of Australia's largest outdoor street festivals, celebrating the Italian culture and cuisine of Melbourne which is held in the district in November.

The La Mama Theatre and Courthouse Theatre are also in this area, as is the heritage-listed neon sign at Borsari's Corner, named after Italian cyclist Nino Borsari, on the corner of Grattan Street. Toto's Pizza House, the first pizzeria established in Australia, has been located at the southern end of Lygon Street continuously since its opening in 1961.

Towards the centre of the district, on the corner of Lygon Street and Argyle Place, there is a small Italian-inspired piazza namedPiazza Italia, which is a joint-redevelopment by Melbourne and its sister city, Milan, in Italy.

The block between Cardigan street and Arglye Place South, are synonymous for the site of celebrations of Italian sport. During the annual Australian Grand Prix, the restaurant district, particularly the stated block, is bathed in red and yellow banners in support of the Ferrari Formula One racing team and, in 1982 and 2006, it was also a major site of Australian celebrations when Italy's national football team won the 1982 and 2006 FIFA World Cups. In 2012, the block, where Notturno Cafe is situated, was the most popular site during the 2012 Euro Cup. In the early hours of 28 June, Lygon street was brought to a stand still following Italy's 2-1 victory over Germany in the semi-finals, advancing to the final against eventual winners Spain, where supporters celebrated on the street for hours, blocking traffic in all directions.

Sport

Melbourne's Italian community has played influential roles in many sports throughout Melbourne. Association Football (soccer) and Australian rules football have been the most popular sports the community has engaged in, at professional levels. There has been influence in the sports of bocce, tennis, and basketball in the community.

Association Football (Soccer)

Football (soccer) has been a fundamental characteristic of sport in Melbourne's Italian community. Many clubs in the past seventy years, competing competitively or defunct, have been in suburbs all over Melbourne, with two clubs participating in the former National Soccer League, being Brunswick Juventus Junior FC (formerly Brunswick Juventus) and Carlton SC. There are currently at least eighteen active clubs based in Melbourne who are competing in various divisions throughout Victoria.

National team players

Clubs

In Melbourne, there are numerous social and sports clubs founded by and/or have a strong Italian following, or have official Italian recognitions.

Active clubs as of the 2022 Victorian football season

Australian Rules Football
In June 2007 the Victorian Football League-Australian Football League announced a (VFL/AFL) Italian Team of the Century, in recognition of the role of Italian Australian players have had in the sport. The vast majority of the official players were born &/or raised in Melbourne. These players consist of:

Notable people

The following list contains notable Italian Australians who were born and/or raised in Melbourne. The list is structured in alphabetical order by surname, and the resident's listed occupation is what he/she was known for. (Incomplete List)

Emma Alberici
Vanessa Amorosi
Tina Arena
George Baldessin
Pietro Baracchi
Ron Barassi Sr.
Ron Barassi Jr.
Melissa Barbieri
Enza Barilla
Steve Bastoni
Edo Benetti
Peter Bevilacqua
Cris Bonacci
Marco Bresciano
Anthony Callea
Blake Caracella
Frank Carbone
Emmanuel Carella
Andrew Carrazzo
Vin Catoggio
Orfeo Cecconato
Chris Cester
Santo Cilauro
Gabriella Cilmi
Chris Ciriello
Simon Colosimo
Vince Colosimo
Paul Cosentino
Frank Curcio
Andrew Daddo
Cameron Daddo
Lochie Daddo
Fausto De Amicis
Ron De Iulio
Brett Deledio
Anthony Di Pietro
Robert DiPierdomenico
Frank Dimattina
Paul Dimattina
Virgil Donati
Brendan Fevola
Matthew Foschini
Vince Grella
Tony Liberatore 
Mark Lo Giudice
Joe Misiti
Dylan Murnane
Tony Pignata
Mark Philippoussis
Louisa Angelina Santospirito
Stephen Silvagni
Lou Sticca

See also

Italian diaspora
Italo-Australian Dialect
Greek community of Melbourne

References

 
European-Australian culture in Melbourne
 
Demographics of Melbourne
Italian-Australian culture in Melbourne
Ethnic groups in Melbourne